The following is a list of international organization leaders in 2004.

UN organizations

Political and economic organizations

Financial organizations

Sports organizations

Other organizations

See also
List of state leaders in 2004
List of religious leaders in 2004
List of colonial governors in 2004
List of international organization leaders in 2003
List of international organization leaders in 2005

References

2004
2004 in international relations
Lists of office-holders in 2004